Malcolm Earl Musser (July 11, 1889 – August 11, 1969) was an American college basketball coach who coached for the Bucknell Bison for 13 years.

Head coaching record

College

References

1889 births
1969 deaths
Basketball coaches from Pennsylvania
Bucknell Bison men's basketball coaches
Sportspeople from Philadelphia